Clemens Heereman von Zuydwyck (26 August 1832 in Hörstel/Riesenbeck – 23 March 1903 in Berlin) was a German Centre Party parliamentarian.

Life 

From 1870 to 1903 Heereman von Zuydwyck was a member of German Reichstag. He lived with his family on castle Surenburg in Hörstel-Riesenbeck.

Awards 
 Order of St. Gregory the Great

References

1832 births
1903 deaths
People from Hörstel
People from the Province of Westphalia
Barons of Germany
German Roman Catholics
Centre Party (Germany) politicians
Members of the 1st Reichstag of the German Empire
Members of the 2nd Reichstag of the German Empire
Members of the 3rd Reichstag of the German Empire
Members of the 4th Reichstag of the German Empire
Members of the 5th Reichstag of the German Empire
Members of the 6th Reichstag of the German Empire
Members of the 7th Reichstag of the German Empire
Members of the 8th Reichstag of the German Empire
Members of the 9th Reichstag of the German Empire
Members of the 10th Reichstag of the German Empire
Members of the Prussian House of Representatives
Knights Grand Cross of the Order of St Gregory the Great